Jeffrey Peek is a finance industry executive. He headed CIT Group from 2003 until it was reorganized following the 2008 financial crisis.

Career
Peek joined CIT after being turned down as a potential CEO from Merrill Lynch, where he had been employed for almost 20 years, and a 19-month spell at Credit Suisse Group. He was directly responsible for expanding CIT into lending subprime mortgages and student loans. This made the company vulnerable to changes in the market, and following the financial crisis, the group plunged into debt. CIT lost £5 billion in the nine quarters up to fall 2009 under Peek's leadership. He resigned following an announcement from bondholders that the company would need to restructure $31 billion of debt. Following his resignation from CIT, the company's shares dropped by 85%, putting it close to bankruptcy. He was replaced by former Merrill Lynch CEO John Thain. He was criticised for expanding CIT too quickly, but colleagues think he may have simply suffered from bad timing.

Business Insider commented, "Humbled and hormone-deprived, Peek goes hat-in-hand to Washington, looking for taxpayer cash." However, BI also said that "in going down this path, he was no different than many of his fellow chief executives on Wall Street."

In 2015, Peek was hired by Bank of America as an executive vice chairman.

Marriage and children
Peek is married to columnist and former investment analyst Liz Peek. They have three children.  In October 2019, their son Andrew Peek, Donald Trump's Europe and Russia adviser, was abruptly removed from his position as Head of European and Russian Affairs at the NSC and is currently under federal investigation.

References

Living people
American chief executives
Year of birth missing (living people)